The 2023 French Elite Motocross Championship season is the 75th French Motocross Championship season. 

The series consists of seven rounds across the country, running from March to July. Milko Potisek is the reigning champion in the Elite MX1, after winning his first title in 2022. Pierre Goupillon is the reigning champion in Elite MX2 after he won his second title in the previous season.

Race calendar and results

Elite MX1

Elite MX2

Circuit locations

Elite MX1
Five time world champion Jeffrey Herlings competed in the opening round of the series as preparation for the 2023 FIM Motocross World Championship.

Participants

Riders Championship
Points are awarded to finishers of the main races, in the following format:

{|
|

Elite MX2

Participants

Riders Championship
Points are awarded to finishers of the main races, in the following format:

{|
|

References

French Elite Motocross Championship
Motocross Championship
French Elite Motocross Championship